Rajaram Piraji Dhale (30 September 1940 – 16 July 2019), commonly referred to as Raja Dhale, was an Indian writer, artist and activist for Dalit rights. In April 1972, he, along with Namdeo Dhasal and J. V. Pawar, founded the Dalit Panthers, an organization dedicated to fighting for the rights of the Dalit community. Dhale was a veteran Ambedkarite and Buddhist.

Career
Dhale was a member of the Republican Party of India and led the Raja Dhale faction, after a split in the party. Dhale was a candidate in the 1999 parliament election from the Mumbai North Central constituency on Bharipa Bahujan Mahasangha party ticket, and 2004 parliament elections from Mumbai North East constituency, again on Bharipa Bahujan Mahasangha ticket.

Notable works
 Dalit Pantherchi Sansthapana: Vastusthiti Ani Viparyas
 Arun Kolhatkarchi Gacchi: Ek Nirupan

References

1940 births
2019 deaths
Dalit activists
Dalit writers
Marathi politicians
Scholars from Mumbai
Indian Buddhists
20th-century Buddhists
21st-century Buddhists
Bharipa Bahujan Mahasangh politicians
Republican Party of India politicians